Survivor is the first album by the American rock band Survivor, recorded and released in 1979. It is the band's only album with its original drummer, Gary Smith, and bass guitarist, Dennis Keith Johnson. The recording sessions, overseen by the A&R executive John Kalodner, were not without difficulties. First, Ron Nevison replaced Barry Mraz as producer, and then the project had to be taken to Bruce Fairbairn in Vancouver to achieve a mix that was to Kalodner's satisfaction. The album took eight months to finally be released.

The album just entered the charts, reaching #169 on the Billboard Hot 100 in spring 1980, but the opening track, "Somewhere In America", was a regional hit in the Chicago area, and "Youngblood", with its dramatic guitar introduction, proved to be something of a blueprint for the band's smash hit two years later, "Eye of the Tiger".

An additional song recorded for the album, "Rockin' into the Night", was rejected by Nevison as "too Southern". It was given to .38 Special who turned the song into a hit. The original Survivor recording became available in 2004 on the compilation Ultimate Survivor.

The single "Rebel Girl" was recorded about a year after the album sessions, though the Japanese release of the album on CD includes it as song number six. The 2010 reissue on Rock Candy Records adds the song as a bonus track.

The model on the cover of the album is the actress Kim Basinger, according to the band's founding member Jim Peterik.

Track listing

Personnel
Survivor 
 Dave Bickler – lead vocals, keyboards
 Jim Peterik – guitar, vocals, lead vocals (6)
 Frankie Sullivan – lead guitar
 Dennis Keith Johnson – bass guitar, Moog bass pedals
 Gary Smith – drums, percussion

Production
 Ron Nevison – producer
 Barry Mraz – producer
 Bruce Fairbairn – recording engineer, mix assistant
 Jim Peterik – recording engineer, mix assistant
 Mike Clink – assistant engineer
 Bob Rock – mixing 
 Mike Salisbury – art direction, album design 
 Mark Feldman – cover photography

Charts

References

External links
[ Survivor] at Allmusic

1979 debut albums
Survivor (band) albums
Albums produced by Ron Nevison
Scotti Brothers Records albums